Calcids are a soil suborder in the USDA soil taxonomy. They are aridisols that have accumulated high levels of residual or dryfall calcium carbonate.

Background 
Calcids have a calcic or petrocalcic horizon and have carbonated materials in any above layers. The parent materials are high in content of carbonate, or carbonates were added as dust, or both. Precipitation has been insufficient to remove the carbonates or even move them to great depths. These soils are often found in the western states of North America. Most areas are used as rangeland or wildlife habitat. Some are used as irrigated cropland.

Aridisols are CaCO3 containing soils of arid regions that exhibit at least some sub-surface horizon development. They are characterized by being dry most of the year and exhibit limited leaching. Aridisols contain sub-surface horizon in which clays, calcium carbonate, silica, salts, and CaCO3 tend to be leached from soils of moister climates. Land dominated by Aridisols are used mainly for range, wildlife, and recreation. Because of the dry climate in which they are found, they are not used for agricultural production unless irrigation water is available. Aridisols are divided into 8 suborders: Cryids, Salids, Durids, Gypsids, Argids, Calcids, Orthids and Cambids.

Chemical nature of calcid 
Calcids have the extent of calcium carbonate so they can also known as calcareous soil or calcisols. Due to high calcium content, coarse texture, undulating surface, and even due to unsuitable climate, calcids are not suitable for fruit tree and crop cultivation. So, if these kinds of soils are irrigated and cultivated then micronutrient deficiency is normal. However, fine loamy textured calcids are good for agriculture.

Other locations of Calcid 

These soils are often found in semi-humid to semi-arid regions. Therefore, about 7.89% of Iran is calcidic soil.

Similarly, Calcidic content can be also found in the soils of Rajasthan (India).

Classification of calcid 
There are different forms of calcids-

 Salicalcids
 Gypsicalcids
 Petrocalcids
 Hypercalcids
 Haplocalcids.

Out of all the calcids, haplocalcids contain various calcitic pro features.

Horizons 
In terms of horizons,

Calcids have a calcic, hypercalcic, or petrocalcic horizon with its / their upper boundary  within 1.0 m of the soil surface.

Within 0.75- 1m of the upper boundaries, calcids soils have no gypsic, hypergypsic or petrogypsic, or salic horizon.

Reaction with other components 
Different kinds of fertilizers and compost can be used to modify the properties of calcidic soils.

 Sulfur compost enhances the chemical properties for example- CEC, OM, and available micro and micronutrients, and increases the productivity of calcareous soil.
 In contrast, biochars even worsen the properties and productivity of calcids by increasing pH and hence limiting crop productivity.

References 

Types of soil